Dhaka Wanderers Club is a football team from Dhaka, Bangladesh. They are one of the oldest and most successful clubs in Bangladesh. The Wanderers dominated the domestic scene during the 1950s and 60s, and were considered to be the one of the biggest clubs in the subcontinent before Bangladesh gained independence. Wanderers have seven domestic league titles and were also the runners-up of the Federation Cup in 1987, losing to Mohammedan SC in the finals. Their rivalry with Mohammedan is seen as the first domestic club rivalry in Bangladeshi football history.

Wanderers last played top flight football in 2007 and after promotion from the Dhaka Senior Division League in 2020, they currently compete in the Bangladesh Championship League (BCL), which is the second tier of football in Bangladesh. The club uses the BSSS Mostafa Kamal Stadium in Dhaka as their home venue.

History

Founded in 1937, the club was first known as Muslim Wanderers, until it became Dhaka Wanderers over time as a bunch of sports-lovers from Old Dhaka brought the club into a prominent position in the local sports arena. Under the teams president  Abdul Gaffar who came from the Nawab's of Dhaka, they became a popular name in Bengali football after its debut in the Dhaka football scene. With the help of Pakistani defender Gafur Baloch and legendary winger Mari Chowdhury, Wanderers lifted the first-division trophy 5 times. Before Bangladesh's independence in 1971, Wanderers had Bengali talents like Nabi Chowdhury, Kabir Ahmad, Amir Jang Ghaznabi, Ashraf Chowdhury, Manzur Hasan Mintu, Zakaria Pintoo and Wazed Gazi to only name a few. The clubs most prominent players Mari, Shantoo and Pintoo got the chance to represent the Pakistan national team, while Pintoo later went on to become captain of both Shadhin Bangla Football Team and Bangladesh. The clubs strength was evident when they participated in the Aga Khan Gold Cup, winning 7–0 and 1–0 respectively, against the senior national team of both Nepal and Sri Lanka. 
 
Including their first league trophy in 1950, the club won a total of seven Dhaka League titles from 1950 to 1960. The historic club also won the league every season from 1950 to 1956, except for the 1952 season, however, like all their other achievements the trophies were burnt during a local riot. During the fifties and sixties, the Wanderers and Mohammedan rivalry was the biggest and most anticipated game in Bengali football. Former Bangladesh prime minister Bangabundhu Sheikh Mujibur Rhaman, was also a regular player at the club during the early 40s and 50s. During the 1972 Dhaka League season, Wanderers striker “Boro” Nazir Ahmed, scored a hattrick against Dilkusha SC, becoming the first player to achieve this feat since the country's independence. Nonetheless, over time after the nations Independence in 1971, the rivalry with Mohammedan SC had lost its presence, as the club moved to the second division in the nineties, losing its huge support base and popularity all over the country. After being relegated from the top-flight again in 2005, the club was an irregular face in domestic competitions, dropping down to the Senior Division League and was only able to achieve promotion to the second-tier in 2020 after runner-up.

Casino scandal
In September 2019, number of Bangladeshi clubs were caught running illegal casinos and Wanderers were one of them. After the casino raid, President Advocate Mollah Abu Kawsar resigned citing personal reasons. General Secretary Joy Gopal Sarkar was sent to jail. Since the incident took place, the team was in dismay, the players were reported to be living in the neighboring club Azad Sporting and some at the hotels or with their relatives, as the club failed to pay their dues. The condition of food is also as miserable as the accommodation. The club had no source of income, and ever since the scandal no donations were being made to help them. Surprisingly, Dhaka Wanderers Club gained promotion from the Dhaka League (third-division since 2007) in 2020. It was the first time the club reached the new second-division league in Bangladesh, after spending decades outside of the country's top 2 leagues. The club finished 7th during their first season in the BCL with 7 wins out of 22 league games. In March 2021, it was revealed that the team's coach Kamal Babu himself paid 18,000 Bangladeshi Taka to the footballers instead of taking his own salary. Despite taking part in the 2020–21 Bangladesh Championship League with so much difficulty, the BFF had supposedly not yet paid the club their participation fee. During this predicament the club faced, a large institution connected with football gave them a check of 3 lakh rupees.

Current squad
Dhaka Wanderers Club  squad for 2022–23 season.

Team records

Head coach

Personnel

Current technical staff

Honours
Dhaka League
Winner (7): 1950, 1951, 1953, 1954, 1955, 1956, 1960
Dhaka First Division League
Winner: 2002
Federation Cup
Runners-up: 1987

References

External links

 Team info at Global Sports Archive
 Team info at Sofascore

Dhaka Wanderers Club
Football clubs in Bangladesh
Association football clubs established in 1937
Sport in Bangladesh
Dhaka